Chhatrari is a village in Himachal Pradesh, India. It is located 48 km from Chamba.

It is known for its Chhatrari Devi temple, which was built by King Meru Verman of Bharmour, in Chamba, Himachal Pradesh, at an altitude of 6000 feet above sea level (32° 28′ N and Long. 76° 10′ E). The main idol of this ancient 8th-century temple is of Shakti, made of Ashtadhatu by a craftsman Gugga, 4 feet 6 inches tall which shows Shakti holding in her hands a lance (power, energy), a lotus (life), a bell (aether, space) and a snake (death and time). There is also an inscription with details of the temple, the king and his ancestors, the craftsman, and the locales of the village.

Every year on the third day of the Manimahesh Yatra, devotees bring water from Manimahesh Lake and the idol of Shakti is bathed in it, with pious rituals. Its history is closely woven with that of Bharmour, due to the Dharmeshvar Mahadev (Dharamraj) Temple in the northern corner of Chaurasi Temple Bharmour, also built by Raja Meru Verman.

The village has 36 water sources with panihars or fountain slabs, and surrounded by Cedrus deodara forests, as also housing an Industrial training Institute.

Gallery

See also
 Bharmour
 Manimahesh Lake
 Chaurasi Temple Bharmour

References

External links 

http://www.himachaltouristguide.com/index.php/chamba/chamba-town/places-of-interest/475-chhatrari
"Photo: Historic Shakti Devi Temple, Chhatrari" Tripadvisor
https://www.india9.com/i9show/Chhatrari-19296.htm

Villages in Chamba district